Nazar Tarasovych Vyzdryk (born 27 April 1996) is a Ukrainian professional footballer who plays as a defender for Estonian club Pärnu.

Career
Vyzdryk is a product of the Youth Sportive School #4 Lviv and FC Karpaty Lviv Sportive School Systems. He made his debut for FC Karpaty playing as a substituted player in a match against FC Volyn Lutsk on 31 May 2017 in the Ukrainian Premier League.

References

External links
 

1996 births
Living people
Ukrainian footballers
Association football defenders
FC Karpaty Lviv players
FC Zirka Kropyvnytskyi players
FC Nyva Vinnytsia players
Pärnu Jalgpalliklubi players
Ukrainian Premier League players
Ukrainian First League players
Ukrainian Second League players
Esiliiga players
Ukrainian expatriate footballers
Expatriate footballers in Estonia
Ukrainian expatriate sportspeople in Estonia